The women's 400 metre freestyle S11 event at the 2012 Paralympic Games took place on 7 September, at the London Aquatics Centre.

Two heats were held, one with five swimmers, the other one with six competitors. The swimmers with the eight fastest times advanced to the final.

Heats

Heat 1

Heat 2

Final

References

Swimming at the 2012 Summer Paralympics
2012 in women's swimming